Takin' My Time is the third studio album by American musician Bonnie Raitt. It was released in 1973 by Warner Bros. Records. The album is an amalgamation of several different genres, including blues, folk, jazz, New Orleans rhythm and blues, and calypso. The 10 tracks on the album are covers, ranging from soft sentimental ballads to upbeat, rhythmic-heavy tracks. Lowell George was originally hired to handle the production, but was ultimately replaced by John Hall when Raitt became unhappy with his production.

Takin' My Time received positive reviews from music critics, and reached number 87 on the US Billboard Top LPs & Tapes chart. Retrospective reviews have also been positive, with critics praising the eclecticism, as well as Raitt's attempts to broaden her musical horizon. Vik Iyengar of AllMusic believes Takin' My Time was Raitt's last consistent album before her comeback in the 1980s. Raitt went on an accompanying tour of the United States.

Background and composition
In 1973, Raitt moved to Los Angeles, and became friends with members of American rock band Little Feat. After the release of their album Dixie Chicken (1973), Raitt hired frontman and guitarist Lowell George to produce her upcoming album. Raitt was unhappy with George's production, which she said was due to a lack of objectivity. According to Raitt: "It became too emotional. It's hard having a strong woman telling the man her ideas when, in fact, the man wants to take over the situation." American musician John Hall was then brought in for production to replace George. Under the direction of Hall, Takin' My Time was recorded from June to July 1973 at Sunset Sound Recorders in Los Angeles.

Takin' My Time combines many different music genres, including blues, folk, jazz, New Orleans rhythm and blues, and calypso. Takin' My Time is similar to Raitt's previous studio album Give It Up (1972), as both albums feature a mix of soft sentimental ballads and upbeat, rhythmic-heavy tracks. The sentimental ballads focus on romance and heartache, and possess a "late night, bluesy intimacy," according to No Depression. The upbeat tracks vary in genre; "Wah She Go Do" is a calypso and reggae-inspired track, while "Let Me In" is a dance track, inspired by polka and ragtime. All 10 tracks on the album are covers of songs from musicians like Jackson Browne, Randy Newman and Calypso Rose.

Release and reception

Takin' My Time was released in October 1973, through Warner Bros. Records. It reached number 87 on the Billboard Top LPs & Tapes chart, and number 91 on the Record World album chart. Raitt supported the album with an incessant touring schedule across the United States; biographer Mark Bego described Raitt's approach to touring as a "perform-pack-unpack-perform lifestyle."

Takin' My Time was met with positive reviews from music critics. The staff of Billboard described the album as "a top mix of blues and ballads such as 'I Gave My Love a Candle' from one of poo's [sic] most underrated female vocalists." A critic for Record World highlighted Hall's production, and wrote: "Bonnie's beautiful voice and super blues guitar playing grace a collection of wonderful songs." Tony Glover of Rolling Stone felt that despite the large amount of musical variety, Takin' My Time was Raitt's most cohesive album. Glover commended the musicianship between Raitt and the backup musicians, with him writing that "it's evident a lot of her soul went into this one, and that makes it worth hearing."

Retrospective reviews of Takin' My Time from critics have also been positive. In his book Christgau's Record Guide: Rock Albums of the Seventies, Robert Christgau commended Raitt's attempt to broaden her musical scope with more eclectic tracks such as "You've Been in Love Too Long" and "Wah She Go Do". Christgau wrote more negatively towards some of the folk-inspired tracks, which he called "too pretty, too ordinary." Robert Gordon of Entertainment Weekly praised the wide musical variety on Takin' My Time, with him saying: "Raitt sounds comfortable singing rhythmic rockers, slow songs, and a swinging New Orleans tune, 'Let Me In.' The lighthearted calypso 'Wah She Go Do' may be just a lark, but it's definitely fun." Vik Iyengar of AllMusic felt Raitt had done a good job at choosing and interpreting the 10 cover tracks, and called Takin' My Time an "underrated gem." Iyengar believed Takin' My Time was Raitt's last consistent album until her comeback in the 1980s.

Track listing
Credits adapted from Bonnie Raitt's official website.

Personnel
Credits adapted from Bonnie Raitt's official website.

Bonnie Raitt – acoustic guitar, electric guitar, vocals, background vocals, handclapping, bottleneck guitar
Paul Barrere – electric guitar
George Bohanon – trombone
Sam Clayton – congas
Carol Farhat – handclapping
Glenn Ferris – horn
Freebo – fretless bass, tuba, background vocals
Lowell George – slide guitar
John Hall – electric guitar, background vocals, handclapping, mellotron
Bob Hardaway – horn
Robert Hardaway – saxophone
Milt Holland – tabla, tambourine, timbales, claves, shaker
Carl Huston – handclapping
Kirby Johnson – conductor
Jim Keltner – drums
Marty Krystall – saxophone
Taj Mahal – harmonica, vocals, background vocals, acoustic bass
Earl Palmer – drums
Van Dyke Parks – piano, keyboard, vocals, background vocals
Bill Payne – organ, piano, electric piano, vocals, background vocals
Joel Peskin – saxophone
Nat Seligman – handclapping
Tony Terran – trumpet
Oscar Brashear – trumpet
Bud Brisbois – trumpet
Ernie Watts – soprano saxophone

Production

John Hall – producer
John Haeny – engineer
Richard Heenan – mixing
Arnie Acosta – mastering
Doug Sax – mastering
Ed Cherney – remastering supervisor
Lee Herschberg – remastering
Jo Motta – project coordinator
H George Bohanon – horn arrangements
Kirby Johnson – horn arrangements
Tom Gamache – art direction, design
Sandy Kroopf – art direction, design, photography, back cover
 Michael Dobo – photography, cover photo

Charts

References

Book sources

1973 albums
Albums recorded at Sunset Sound Recorders
Bonnie Raitt albums
Covers albums
Warner Records albums